Charlotte Alexandra Mary Seeley, usually credited as Charlotte Alexandra, is an English film actress. She is best known for her appearance in several controversial, sexually-explicit feature films in the mid to late 1970s.

She has also acted under her given name Charlotte Seeley.

Career
In 1973, Alexandra appeared in the film Contes immoraux (Immoral Tales), an erotica film directed by Walerian Borowczyk, and Les Baiseuses which was titled Jailbait or That Girl Is a Tramp in the US. In 1976, Alexandra had a starring role in Une vraie jeune fille which was directed and written by Catherine Breillat. Alexandra played the role of a 14-year-old girl who goes through a turbulent sexual awakening. In English-speaking countries, the film was called A Real Young Girl in the US and A Real Young Lady in the UK. The film was not released until 1999 due to its graphic depiction of sexuality, including explicit close-ups of Alexandra's vulva.

In 1976, she also appeared in the film L'Acrobate, a comedy-drama directed by Jean-Daniel Pollet. In 1977, she appeared in Goodbye Emmanuelle and The Strange Case of the End of Civilization as We Know It, and her later films included Spookies and Personal Services under the name Charlotte Seeley.

She appeared as Georgina Marshall (wife to Paul Nicholas' character Vince Pinner) in the third & final series of Just Good Friends, originally broadcast in 1986.

Filmography
 Immoral Tales (1973) .... Thérèse
 Les Baiseuses (1975) .... House of Correction Supervisor
 Une vraie jeune fille (1976) .... Alice Bonnard
 L'Acrobate de Jean-Daniel Pollet (1976) .... Louise
 A Real Young Girl (1976) but released on 1999
 The Strange Case of the End of Civilization as We Know It (1977) .... Miss Moneypacket
 Goodbye Emmanuelle (1977) .... Chloe
 Spookies (1986) .... Adrienne
 Personal Services (1987) .... Diane

References

External links

English film actresses
Living people
1954 births
20th-century English actresses